Route 710 is a highway in New Brunswick, Canada that runs from an intersection of Route 124 in Hatfield Point to an intersection with Route 10 in Long Creek.

Communities
 Hatfield Point
 The Grant
 Henderson Settlement
 Big Cove
 Cambridge-Narrows
 Hammtown
 Thornetown
 Codys
 Chambers Corner

See also
List of New Brunswick provincial highways

References

New Brunswick provincial highways
Roads in Queens County, New Brunswick
Roads in Kings County, New Brunswick